John Campbell (unknown – died May 19, 1845) was a U.S. Representative from South Carolina, brother of Robert Blair Campbell.

Born near Brownsville, Marlboro County, South Carolina, Campbell had graduated from South Carolina College (now the University of South Carolina) in Columbia in 1819.  He studied law.  He was admitted to the bar and commenced practice in Brownsville, South Carolina.  He moved to Parnassus, Marlboro District, and continued the practice of law.

Campbell was elected as a Jacksonian to the Twenty-first Congress (March 4, 1829 – March 3, 1831).  Campbell was elected as a Nullifies to the Twenty-fifth Congress and as a Democrat to the three succeeding Congresses (March 4, 1837 – March 3, 1843).  He served as Chairman of the Committee on Elections (Twenty-sixth Congress), Committee on District of Columbia (Twenty-eighth Congress).

He died in Parnassus (now Blenheim), Marlboro County, South Carolina, on May 19, 1845.  He was interred in a private cemetery near Blenheim, South Carolina.

Sources

Year of birth unknown
1845 deaths
People from Marlboro County, South Carolina
Nullifier Party members of the United States House of Representatives
Nullifier Party politicians
Jacksonian members of the United States House of Representatives from South Carolina
19th-century American politicians
Democratic Party members of the United States House of Representatives from South Carolina